Haut-Ntem is a department of Woleu-Ntem Province in northern Gabon. The capital is Minvoul. It had a population of 10,838 in 2013.

Towns and villages

References

Woleu-Ntem Province
Departments of Gabon